Hans Erdmann (7 November 1882 – 21 November 1942) was a German composer. He produced several film scores for German films.

Selected filmography
 Nosferatu (1922)
 Le testament du Dr. Mabuse/The Testament of Dr. Mabuse (1933)
 Augustus the Strong (1936)

Bibliography
 Kester, Bernadette. Representations of the First World War in German Films of the Weimar Period (1919-1933). Amersterdam University Press, 2003.

External links

1882 births
1942 deaths
German composers
Artists from Wrocław
People from the Province of Silesia